FreeMind is a free mind mapping application written in Java, which is further developed by the fork Freeplane until today (2021). FreeMind itself was last updated in 2014. FreeMind is licensed under the GNU General Public License Version 2. It provides extensive export capabilities. It runs on Microsoft Windows, Linux, and macOS via the Java Runtime Environment.

As with other mind mapping software packages, FreeMind allows the user to edit a hierarchical set of ideas around a central concept.  The non-linear approach assists in brainstorming new outlines and projects as ideas are added around the mind map.  As a Java application, FreeMind is portable across multiple platforms and retains the same user interface, causing some amount of variation from the common interface on each platform.  Mac users may notice the most difference from their traditional user interface, but a MacWorld reviewer says the software's features should still appeal to the segment of users who accept function over form.

FreeMind was a finalist for Best Project in SourceForge.net's Community Choice Awards for 2008, which featured open-source software projects.

Features 

FreeMind's documentation is itself available as a FreeMind mindmap, demonstrating many of the features of the application. This is accessed from the application menu: Help > Documentation. A flash based export of this documentation is available online and can be viewed from flash-enabled web browsers. The link can be found in the external links section.

FreeMind's most significant features are as follows:
 Folding branches
 Save files as XML with an  suffix
 Export hypertext to HTML and XHTML
 Export document to PDF and OpenDocument
 Exports image to PNG, JPEG and SVG
 Icons on nodes
 Clouds around branches
 Graphical links connecting nodes
 Search restricted to single branches
 Web and file hyperlinks from nodes
 FreeMind browser/player for web in Java or Flash
 Transform maps using XSLT

FreeMind uses the Swing GUI toolkit for Java.

FreeMind developers or developers of other projects have made plugins for various wiki and content management system software so that Freemind files can be viewed and in some cases created via the web interface.

See also 

 Freeplane, a FreeMind fork
 List of mind mapping software
 Mind map

References

External links 
 
 FreeMind Review
 Online Demonstration of FreeMind Documentation (requires flash)

Concept mapping software
Mind-mapping software
Concept- and mind-mapping software programmed in Java
Free note-taking software
Free software programmed in Java (programming language)